The Waitākere Ranges is a mountain range in New Zealand. The area, traditionally known to Māori as Te Wao Nui o Tiriwa (The Great Forest of Tiriwa), is of local, regional, and national significance. The ranges are part of the Waitākere Ranges Regional Park.

From 1 May 2018 the forested areas of the Waitākere Ranges Regional Park were closed, with some exceptions, while Auckland Council upgraded the tracks to dry foot standard protect the roots and to prevent the spread of kauri dieback, bacteria that affect kauri trees and prevents them from getting nutrients, effectively killing them. There is no cure. But

Etymology 

The name Wai-tākere originally came from a rock located in Waitākere Bay near Te Henga (Bethells Beach). In Māori the name Te Wao Nui a Tiriwa ("The Great Forest of Tiriwa"), referred to all of the forested areas south from Muriwai and the Kaipara Harbour portage to the Manukau Harbour, while the name Hikurangi referred to the central and Western Waitākere Ranges, south of the Waitākere River.

Geology

The rugged upstanding topography is formed from erosion-resistant ancient volcanic conglomerate and lava flows laid down in eruptions from the large Waitākere volcano to the west 12–25 million years ago. The Waitākere Ranges and land south from Muriwai are the eastern slopes of the volcano, which were uplifted from the sea floor between 3 and 5 million years ago. Much of the rock that forms the ranges, such as the Piha Formation and Nihotupu Formation, are volcanic and marine conglomerate rocks. Many of the features of the ranges, such as Karekare, Te Toka-Tapu-a-Kupe / Ninepin Rock and Pukematekeo, are remnants of volcanic vents and plugs.

Geography

The western coastline of the ranges consists of cliffs exceeding , interspersed infrequently with beaches. The ranges are covered in native forest, most of which is in the process of regeneration since extensive logging and farming in the mid–late 19th and early 20th centuries. The Scenic Drive follows a ridge of high points along the eastern ranges, connecting the communities of Titirangi, Waiatarua and Swanson. Along this ridge are some of the more notable peaks of the ranges, including Ruaotuwhenua, known for its radome and adjacent television mast, and Pukematekeo, the northernmost of the ranges which looks out over metropolitan Auckland.

Early history 

A number of Tāmaki Māori are associated with the early settlement of the Waitākere Ranges. In the creation legend of the Auckland volcanic field, the Waitākere Ranges was home to a tribe of supernatural beings known as Tahurangi (called patupaiarehe in other traditions), who battled with the patupaiarehe of the Hunua Ranges. The Māori language name of the Waitākere Ranges, Te Wao Nui a Tiriwa, refers to Tiriwa, a chief of the Tūrehu patupaiarehe. The coastline of the ranges and the Manukau Harbour is traditionally thought to be guarded by the taniwha Paikea, while the Waitākere River and northern ranges were the home to Te Mokoroa, a malevolent taniwha. The ranges were visited by Rakatāura, the senior tohunga (priest/navigator) of the Tainui migratory canoe, who named many of the locations along the west coast.

The area is within the traditional rohe of the iwi Te Kawerau ā Maki, whose most intensive settlements were traditionally around the Waitākere River and Te Henga / Bethells Beach being major focal points for settlement. Much of the coastline and river valleys were settled due to the resource-rich forests and coastline, with over 550 recorded archaeological sites recorded in the area.

The warm, sheltered valleys of the west coast streams were well suited for growing crops such as kūmara, taro, hue (calabash) and aruhe (bracken fern), and were the cause of many early wars in the area. Te Kawerau ā Maki benefited from the abundant seafood found on the coast, as well as resources found deeper within the Waitākere Ranges, such as birds, seasonal berries, eels and crayfish. Over 50 pā were located around the Waitākere Ranges, and many caves and rock shelters were used as refuges during times of war between the 16th and 18th centuries, including Lion Rock in Piha, which was the location of Whakaari pā, and the caves in Whatipu. The Waitākere Ranges sites have a large number of wood and fibre artefacts due to the weather conditions of the area. Surveys in the early 1900s uncovered traditional textile fragments such as fishing nets, baskets, cloak fragments, from locations such as Anawhata, Piha, Takatu Point, Karekare and Whatipu. In 1853 and 1854, the New Zealand government acquired around 100,000 acres of Te Kawerau ā Maki land, purchased from other iwi without consultation of Te Kawerau ā Maki. Reserves were created at Piha and Te Henga (Bethells Beach), however by the 1950s almost all Te Kawerau ā Maki land in the Waitākere Ranges had been partitioned and sold.

In the late 19th century, the Waitākere Ranges area became popular for sightseers, especially the Waitākere Falls.

Regional Park 
The Waitākere Ranges Regional Park, protected at local, regional, and national levels, is an area of some 17,000 ha, established over a period of 110 years through gifts, grants, purchases, and vestings (including legislation promoted by Auckland City Council in 1941 to create the Auckland Centennial Memorial Park, commemorating the centenary of the Metropolitan District of Auckland). The park is one of the largest regional park in New Zealand, alongside the Hunua Ranges.

In 1894 a group led by Sir Algernon Thomas (the first professor of natural sciences at Auckland University College, now the University of Auckland) persuaded the Auckland City Council to preserve 3,500 acres (14 km2) in the Nihotupu area of the ranges as a bush reserve. In 1895 the national Government vested the land, and several other smaller areas of the ranges, in the City Council as "reserves for the conservation of native flora and fauna". The Waitākere Ranges Regional Park now contains about 39,500 acres (160 km2).  The area is also protected under the Waitākere Ranges Heritage Area Act of 2008.

The Waitākere Ranges Regional Park covers about 60% of the area protected by the Waitākere Ranges Heritage Area Act of 2008. The act protects approximately 27,700 ha of both public (the Waitākere Ranges Regional Park) and privately owned land.

Attractions

Some of the ranges' main attractions are: the four popular surf beaches, Piha, Muriwai, Te Henga (Bethells Beach), Karekare; an extensive network of bush walks and tracks; and panoramic views of the east and west coasts and the city. A road, aptly named Scenic Drive, runs a good portion of the length of the ranges from Titirangi to Swanson. Auckland City Council operates an information centre on Scenic Drive, called Arataki Visitor Centre.

The beaches are typical of west coast beaches north of Taranaki in that they are all black sand beaches. They have a reputation of being dangerous for swimmers due to rips and large swells. Surf Life Saving Clubs patrol designated areas of the four most popular beaches during the summer months. Piha Surf Life Saving Club is the oldest of these, being founded in 1934.

On 11 January 2010, the Auckland Regional Council opened the Hillary Trail, a 77 km trail running roughly south–north from the Arataki Visitor Centre to Muriwai through the Waitākere Ranges, named in honour of the New Zealand mountaineer Sir Edmund Hillary.  The Hilary Trail  is regarded as one of or maybe the best multi day hike in the north of the country.

Reservoirs
Five reservoirs within the ranges supply water to the Auckland region, including the Waitākere Reservoir and the Lower Nihotupu Reservoir. Combined, the reservoirs supply approximately 26% of Auckland's potable water demand. The ranges receive an average of over 2,000 mm (78.75 inches) of rainfall annually while the corresponding rate in the city is less than half that. As weather systems approach across the Tasman Sea, their path is blocked by the ranges causing a small uplift sufficient to trigger orographic rainfall.

Fauna
The area is home to kauri snails, glowworms and native long-tailed bats. Long-tailed and short-tailed bats are New Zealand's only native land-based mammals. At the northern end of the ranges, Otakamiro Point is the site of one of New Zealand's few mainland gannet breeding colonies.  In the bush are many indigenous invertebrates, including kauri snail, wētā and oviparous velvet worms with 14 pairs of legs, and ovoviviparous species of 15 and 16 pairs of legs in the genus Peripatoides.

The Ark in the Park conservation initiative, a partnership between Forest and Bird and the Auckland Council, is working to reintroduce some of the species made extinct in the Cascades Kauri Park section of the ranges.

Demographics

Waitākere Ranges had a population of 2,385 at the 2018 New Zealand census, an increase of 234 people (10.9%) since the 2013 census, and an increase of 348 people (17.1%) since the 2006 census. There were 873 households, comprising 1,206 males and 1,179 females, giving a sex ratio of 1.02 males per female, with 456 people (19.1%) aged under 15 years, 396 (16.6%) aged 15 to 29, 1,230 (51.6%) aged 30 to 64, and 300 (12.6%) aged 65 or older.

Ethnicities were 92.3% European/Pākehā, 12.5% Māori, 4.2% Pacific peoples, 3.6% Asian, and 1.6% other ethnicities. People may identify with more than one ethnicity.

The percentage of people born overseas was 20.8, compared with 27.1% nationally.

Although some people chose not to answer the census's question about religious affiliation, 69.6% had no religion, 19.5% were Christian, 0.3% had Māori religious beliefs, 0.6% were Hindu, 0.1% were Muslim, 0.8% were Buddhist and 3.1% had other religions.

Of those at least 15 years old, 552 (28.6%) people had a bachelor's or higher degree, and 216 (11.2%) people had no formal qualifications. 477 people (24.7%) earned over $70,000 compared to 17.2% nationally. The employment status of those at least 15 was that 1,038 (53.8%) people were employed full-time, 354 (18.4%) were part-time, and 57 (3.0%) were unemployed.

List of peaks

List of named peaks (either officially gazetted, informal or traditional) within the Waitākere Ranges, and major unnamed peaks over 400 metres in height.

References

External links

 Waitakere Ranges Protection Society
 Waitākere Ranges at the Auckland Council
 Ark in the Park
 Hillary Trail – Waitākere Ranges
 

 
Waitākere Ranges Local Board Area
Mountain ranges of New Zealand
Tourist attractions in the Auckland Region
Mountains of the Auckland Region
Parks in the Auckland Region
Regional parks of New Zealand
West Auckland, New Zealand